is a Japanese voice actress and part of Aoni Production. She is known voicing as Sun Shang Xiang in Dynasty Warriors and Warriors Orochi series.

Voice roles

Anime
Crayon Shin-chan: Arashi wo Yobu Mouretsu! Otona Teikoku no Gyakushuu (movie) as Reception woman
Gegege no Kitaro (TV 4/1996) as Azuki-Babaa (2nd)
Haré+Guu (TV) as Adi
Jigoku Sensei Nube (TV) as mini yuurei; Shizuka Kikuchi
Jigoku Sensei Nube: Kyoufu no Natsu Yasumi! Asashi no Uni no Gensetsu (movie) as Shizuka
Jungle Wa Itsumo Hale Nochi Guu Deluxe (OAV) as Adi
Kindaichi Shōnen no Jikenbo (TV) as Fujiko Akamine (ep 95-99)
One Piece (TV) as Rika
Outlaw Star (TV) as Clerk
Rumbling Hearts (TV) as Miki
Sailor Moon Sailor Stars (TV) as Airport Announcer (ep 173); Ami's Friend (ep 170); Announcer (eps 175,180,189); Big Sister (ep 186); Bodyguard (ep 187); Child (ep 177); Girl (eps 169,192); Hostess on Train (ep 183); Mirror Paredri (ep 168); Nurse (ep 185); Reporter (ep 195); Schoolgirl (ep 176); Secretary (eps 174,179,181); Stewardess (ep 188); Tulip (ep 171)
Sailor Moon SuperS (TV) as Announcer (ep 147); Child (ep 144); Child (ep 153); Child A (ep 158); Freaks (ep 162); Girl B (ep 149); Samurai-Onna (ep 166)
Sailor Moon SuperS Movie: Black Dream Hole as Bonbon Babies
Sailor Moon SuperS Plus - Ami's First Love (special) as Girl
Sentimental Journey (TV) as Noriko (ep 4)
Yu-Gi-Oh! (movie) as Shun
Yu-Gi-Oh! (TV) as Kageyama sister B (ep 15); Woman announcer (ep 22)

Drama CD
School Days: Original Drama CD Vol. 1 as Itaru Itou

Tokusatsu
 Mirai Sentai Timeranger as Sniper Reihou (ep 15)

Video game roles
Atwight Eks in "Tales of Destiny 2" (Japanese)
Atwight Eks in "Tales of Destiny PS2" (Japanese)
Itaru Itou in "School Days" (as Kagetsu Nanba)
Itaru Itou in "Summer Days"/"Shiny Days" (as Kagetsu Nanba)
Miyuki in "Xenosaga" (Japanese)
Sun Shang Xiang in "Dynasty Warriors 3" (Japanese)
Sun Shang Xiang in "Dynasty Warriors 4" (Japanese)
Kururu (Girl Type) in "Kemono Friends" (Japanese)

References

External links
 
 Aoni Production

Year of birth missing (living people)
Japanese voice actresses
Living people
Aoni Production voice actors